Rahimić is a Bosnian surname. Notable people with the surname include:

Elvir Rahimić (born 1976), retired Bosnian footballer
Ibrahim Rahimić (born 1963), retired Bosnian footballer

Bosnian surnames
Slavic-language surnames
Patronymic surnames
Surnames from given names